A cathedral (from the Greek kathedra (καθέδρα), seat, bench, chair) is a Christian church which contains the seat of a bishop, thus serving as the central church of a diocese.

This is the list of cathedrals in India sorted by denomination.

Catholic Church

Cathedrals of the Roman Catholic Church in India:

Latin Catholic Provinces

Ecclesiastical Province of Agra
Cathedral of the Immaculate Conception of the Archdiocese of Agra
Akbar's Church, former cathedral of the Archdiocese of Agra
 Cathedral of the Immaculate Conception of the Diocese of Ajmer
 St. Joseph's Cathedral of the Diocese of Allahabad
 Cathedral of St. Alphonsus de Ligouri of the Diocese of Bareilly
 St. Joseph's Cathedral in Kotdwar of the Diocese of Bijnor
 St. Joseph's Cathedral of the Diocese of Gorakhpur
 Cathedral of Our Lady of the Annunciation of the Diocese of Jaipur
 Cathedral of St. Anthony of the Diocese of Jhansi
 St. Joseph's Cathedral of the Diocese of Lucknow
 St. Joseph's Cathedral of the Diocese of Meerut
 Our Lady of Fátima Cathedral of the Diocese of Udaipur
 St. Mary's Cathedral of the Diocese of Varanasi

Ecclesiastical Province of Bangalore
 St. Francis Xavier's Cathedral of the Archdiocese of Bangalore
 St. Patricks's Church, former cathedral of the Archdiocese of Bangalore
 Cathedral of Our Lady of the Family Rosary of Fátima of the Diocese of Belgaum
 St. Antony's Cathedral of the Diocese of Bellary
 St. Joseph's Cathedral of the Diocese of Chikmagalur
 Cathedral of Mother Mary of Divine Grace of the Diocese of Gulbarga
 Cathedral of the Assumption of Our Lady of the Diocese of Karwar
 Our Lady of Rosary of Mangalore of the Diocese of Mangalore
 Cathedral of St. Joseph and St. Philomena of the Diocese of Mysore
 Sacred Heart Cathedral of the Diocese of Shimoga
 Cathedral of Our Lady of the Miracles of the Diocese of Udupi

Ecclesiastical Province of Bhopal
St. Francis of Assisi Cathedral of the Archdiocese of Bhopal
 Cathedral of St. John the Baptist of the Diocese of Gwalior
 St. Francis of Assisi Cathedral of the Diocese of Indore
 Sts. Peter and Paul Cathedral of the Diocese of Jabalpur
 Cathedral of the Annunciation of the Diocese of Jhabua
 St. Mary's Cathedral of the Diocese of Khandwa
 St. Theresa's Cathedral in Sagar Cantonment of the Diocese of Sagar
 St. Vincent Syro-Malabar Catholic Cathedral of the Syro-Malabar Catholic Diocese of Satna
 St. Mary's Cathedral of the Diocese of Ujjain

Ecclesiastical Province of Bombay
Cathedral of the Holy Name of the Archdiocese of Bombay
 St. Thomas Syro-Malabar Cathedral of the Diocese of Kalyan
 Cathedral of St. Anne of the Diocese of Nashik
 St Patrick's Cathedral of the Diocese of Poona
 Cathedral of Our Lady of Grace of the Diocese of Vasai

Ecclesiastical Province of Calcutta
 Cathedral of the Most Holy Rosary of the Archdiocese of Calcutta
 Cathedral of the Sacred Heart of the Diocese of Asansol
 Cathedral of the Good Shepherd of the Diocese of Bagdogra
 Cathedral of the Immaculate Heart of Mary and St. Teresa of Calcutta of the Diocese of Baruipur
 Immaculate Conception Cathedral of the Diocese of Darjeeling
 Christ Redeemer Cathedral of the Diocese of Jalpaiguri
 Cathedral of the Holy Redeemer of the Diocese of Krishnagar
 St. Joseph the Worker Cathedral of the Diocese of Raiganj

Ecclesiastical Province of Cuttack-Bhubaneswar
Cathedral of the Most Holy Rosary in Cuttack of the Archdiocese of Cuttack-Bhubaneswar
St. Vincent De Paul Pro-Cathedral of the Archdiocese of Cuttack-Bhubaneswar
 Christ the King Cathedral of the Diocese of Balasore
 Queen of the Missions Cathedral of the Diocese of Berhampur
 Cathedral of St. Joseph the Worker of the Diocese of Rayagada
 Sacred Heart Cathedral of the Diocese of Rourkela
 St. Joseph the Worker Cathedral of the Diocese of Sambalpur

Ecclesiastical Province of Delhi
Sacred Heart Cathedral, New Delhi of the Archdiocese of Delhi
 St. Mary's Cathedral in Jammu Cantonment of the Diocese of Jammu-Srinagar
 Holy Family Catholic Church (Srinagar), former cathedral of the Diocese of Jammu-Srinagar
 St. Mary's Cathedral of the Diocese of Jalandhar
 Cathedral of St. Michael and St. Joseph in Shimla of the Diocese of Simla and Chandigarh
 Christ the King Co-Cathedral in Chandigarh of the Diocese of Simla and Chandigarh

Ecclesiastical Province of Gandhinagar
Premavatar Isu Mandir, cathedral of the Archdiocese of Gandhinagar
 Mount Carmel Cathedral of the Diocese of Ahmedabad
 Our Lady of the Rosary Cathedral of the Diocese of Baroda
 Prem Mandir of the Syro-Malabar Catholic Diocese of Rajkot

Ecclesiastical Province of Goa and Daman
Se Cathedral of the Archdiocese of Goa and Daman
Cathedral of Bom Jesus, Daman in Daman former cathedral of the Diocese of Daman, now in the Archdiocese of Goa and Daman
 Cathedral of Our Lady of Miracles in Sawantwadi of the Diocese of Sindhudurg

Ecclesiastical Province of Guwahati
Christ the Bearer of Good News Cathedral of the Archdiocese of Guwahati
St. Joseph's Co-Cathedral of the Archdiocese of Guwahati
 Christ, Light of the World Cathedral of the Diocese of Bongaigaon
 Cathedral of the Sacred Heart of the Diocese of Dibrugarh
 Cathedral of the Risen Christ of the Diocese of Diphu
 Cathedral of St. Joseph of the Diocese of Itanagar
 Cathedral of Christ the Light of the Diocese of Miao
 Cathedral of St. John Bosco of the Diocese of Tezpur

Ecclesiastical Province of Hyderabad
 St Joseph's Cathedral, Hyderabad of the Archdiocese of Hyderabad
 Basilica of Our Lady of the Assumption, Secunderabad, former cathedral of the Archdiocese of Hyderabad
 Holy Family Cathedral of the Diocese of Adilabad
 St. Mary's Cathedral of the Diocese of Cuddapah
 Divine Mercy Cathedral of the Diocese of Khammam
 St. Joseph's Co-cathedral of the Diocese of Khammam
 Our Lady of Lourdes Cathedral of the Diocese of Kurnool
 St. Teresa's Co-Cathedral of the Diocese of Kurnool
 Mariarani Cathedral (Mary Queen of the Apostles Cathedral) of the Diocese of Nalgonda
 Our Lady of Fátima Cathedral in Hanamakonda of the Diocese of Warangal

Ecclesiastical Province of Imphal
St. Joseph's Cathedral of the Archdiocese of Imphal
 Mary Help of Christians Cathedral of the Diocese of Kohima

Ecclesiastical Province of Madras and Mylapore
San Thome Basilica, cathedral of the Archdiocese of Madras and Mylapore
St. Mary of the Angels Co-Cathedral of the Archdiocese of Madras and Mylapore
 Cathedral of St. Joseph of the Diocese of Chingleput 
 St. Michael's Cathedral of the Diocese of Coimbatore
 Sacred Heart Cathedral of the Diocese of Ootacamund
 Assumption Cathedral of the Diocese of Vellore

Ecclesiastical Province of Madurai
Cathedral of Our Lady of Dolours (St.Mary's Cathedral) of the Archdiocese of Madurai
 St. Joseph's Cathedral of the Diocese of Dindigul 
 St. Xavier's Church, Kottar( St. Xavier Cathedral) of the Diocese of Kottar
 Holy Trinity Cathedral, Thirithuvapuram of the Diocese of Kuzhithurai
 St. Francis Xavier's Cathedral of the Diocese of Palayamkottai
 Our lady of Ransom Cathedral(Alangara Annai Cathedral) of the Diocese of Sivagangai
 St.Mary's Cathedral of the Diocese of Tiruchirapalli
 Sacred Heart Cathedral of the Diocese of Tuticorin

Ecclesiastical Province of Nagpur
St. Francis de Sales Cathedral of the Archdiocese of Nagpur
 St. Francis Xavier's Cathedral of the Diocese of Amravati
 St. Francis de Sales Cathedral of the Diocese of Aurangabad
 St. Thomas Cathedral in Ballarpur of the Diocese of Chanda

Ecclesiastical Province of Patna
Queen of Apostles Cathedral of the Archdiocese of Patna
St. Joseph's Pro-Cathedral of the Archdiocese of Patna
 Padri Ki Haveli former cathedral of the Archdiocese of Patna
 Cathedral of the Nativity of the Blessed Virgin Mary of the Diocese of Bettiah 
 Immaculate Conception Cathedral of the Diocese of Bhagalpur
 Cathedral of Mary Mother of Perpetual Help of the Diocese of Buxar
 Cathedral of St. Francis Assisi of the Diocese of Muzaffarpur
 St. Peter's Cathedral of the Diocese of Purnea

Ecclesiastical Province of Pondicherry and Cuddalore
Immaculate Conception Cathedral, Pondicherry of the Archdiocese of Pondicherry and Cuddalore
Sacred Heart Cathedral of the Diocese of Dharmapuri
Our lady of Ransom Cathedral ( St.Mary's Cathedral ) of the Diocese of Kumbakonam
Infant Jesus Cathedral of the Diocese of Salem
St. Mary's Co-Cathedral in Shevapet of the Diocese of Salem
Sacred Heart Cathedral of the Diocese of Tanjore

Ecclesiastical Province of Raipur
St. Joseph's Cathedral of the Archdiocese of Raipur
 Cathedral of the Immaculate Mother of God of the Diocese of Ambikapur
 St. Joseph's Cathedral of the Diocese of Jagdalpur
 Cathedral of Our Lady of the Rosary in Kunkuri of the Diocese of Jashpur
 Cathedral of St. Michael of the Diocese of Raigarh

Ecclesiastical Province of Ranchi
St Mary's Immaculate Conception Cathedral of the Archdiocese of Ranchi
 Shanti ki Maharani Church, cathedral of the Diocese of Daltonganj
 Cathedral of St. Paul of the Diocese of Dumka
 St. Patrick's Cathedral of the Diocese of Gumla
 Cathedral of the Resurrection of the Diocese of Hazaribag
 St. Joseph's Cathedral of the Diocese of Jamshedpur
 Cathedral of St. Michael of the Diocese of Khunti
 Stella Maris Cathedral of the Diocese of Port Blair
 St. Anne Cathedral of the Diocese of Simdega

Ecclesiastical Province of Shillong
Cathedral of Mary Help of Christians of the Archdiocese of Shillong
Cathedral of St. Francis Xavier of the Diocese of Agartala
Church of Shantir Rani, former cathedral of the Diocese of Agartala
 Christ the King Cathedral of the Diocese of Aizawl
 Church of the Holy Cross, former cathedral of the Diocese of Silchar, now in the Diocese of Aizawl
 Cathedral of St. Theresa of Lisieux of the Diocese of Jowai
 Cathedral of St. Peter the Apostle of the Diocese of Nongstoin
 Cathedral of Mary Help of Christians of the Diocese of Tura

Ecclesiastical Province of Thiruvananthapuram
 St. Joseph's Cathedral of the Archdiocese of Thiruvananthapuram
 Mount Carmel Cathedral in Alappuzha of the Diocese of Alleppey
 Immaculate Conception Cathedral of the Diocese of Neyyattinkara
 St. Mary's Cathedral, Punalur of the Diocese of Punalur
 Infant Jesus Cathedral in Tangasseri of the Diocese of Quilon
 Immaculate Conception Cathedral in Pullichira, former cathedral of the Diocese of Quilon

Ecclesiastical Province of Verapoly
 St. Francis Assisi Cathedral, Ernakulam of the Archdiocese of Verapoly
Varapuzha Basilica, former cathedral of the Archdiocese of Verapoly
 Mother of God Cathedral of the Diocese of Calicut
 Santa Cruz Basilica of the Diocese of Cochin
 Cathedral of the Holy Trinity of the Diocese of Kannur
 St. Michael's Cathedral in Kodungallur (Cranganore) of the Diocese of Kottapuram
 San Sebastian Cathedral of the Diocese of Sultanpet
 Immaculate Heart of Mary Cathedral in Kottayam of the Diocese of Vijayapuram

Ecclesiastical Province of Visakhapatnam
St. Peter's Cathedral of the Archdiocese of Visakhapatnam
 St. Anne's Co-Cathedral of the Archdiocese of Visakhapatnam
 Amalodbhavi Cathedral of the Diocese of Eluru
 Bala Yesu Cathedral in Phirangipuram of the Diocese of Guntur
 St. Joseph's Cathedral of the Diocese of Nellore
 Cathedral of Our Lady of Mercy of the Diocese of Srikakulam
 St. Paul's Cathedral of the Diocese of Vijayawada
 St. Peter's Co-Cathedral of the Diocese of Vijayawada

Syro-Malabar Ecclesiastical Provinces

Province of Eranakulam - Angamaly
St. Mary's Syro-Malabar Catholic Cathedral Basilica, Ernakulam of the Syro-Malabar Catholic Archdiocese of Eranakulam-Angamaly
Mar Hormizd Syro-Malabar Church, Angamaly, co-cathedral of the Syro-Malabar Catholic Archdiocese of Eranakulam-Angamaly
St George's Cathedral of the Syro-Malabar Catholic Diocese of Idukki
St George's Cathedral of the Syro-Malabar Catholic Diocese of Kothamangalam

Province of Changanassery
St Mary's Metropolitan Cathedral of the Syro-Malabar Catholic Archdiocese of Changanassery
St. Dominic's Cathedral of the Syro-Malabar Catholic Diocese of Kanjirappally
St. Thomas Cathedral, Pala of the Syro-Malabar Catholic Diocese of Palai
Cathedral of the Syro-Malabar Catholic Diocese of Thuckalay

Province of Tellicherry
St. Joseph's Cathedral in Palissery of the Syro-Malabar Catholic Archdiocese of Tellicherry
Cathedral of St. Lawrence of the Syro-Malabar Catholic Diocese of Belthangady 
Little Flower Cathedral in Narasimharajapura of the Syro-Malabar Catholic Diocese of Bhadravathi
St. Anthony's church, Iduvally, former Pro-Cathedral of the Syro-Malabar Catholic Diocese of Bhadravathi
St Joseph's Cathedral of the Syro-Malabar Catholic Diocese of Mananthavady 
Mary Matha Cathedral of the Syro-Malabar Catholic Diocese of Thamarassery
Infant Jesus Cathedral in Mysore of the Syro-Malabar Catholic Diocese of Mandya

Province of Thrissur
Our Lady of Lourdes Syro-Malabar Catholic Metropolitan Cathedral of the Syro-Malabar Catholic Archdiocese of Thrissur
Holy Trinity Cathedral of the Syro-Malabar Catholic Diocese of Ramanathapuram
St Thomas Cathedral of the Syro-Malabar Catholic Diocese of Irinjalakuda
St. Mary's Forane Church in Puthenchira, former cathedral of the Syro-Malabar Catholic Diocese of Irinjalakuda
St Raphael's Cathedral of the Syro-Malabar Catholic Diocese of Palghat

Archdiocese of Kottayam
Christ the King Cathedral of the Syro-Malabar Catholic Archeparchy of Kottayam

Directly under the Holy See
Kristuraja Cathedral of the Syro-Malabar Catholic Diocese of Faridabad
St. Antony's Syro‑Malabar Catholic Church, Noothenchery, cathedral of the Syro-Malabar Catholic Diocese of Hosur
St. Alphonsa Syro-Malabar Catholic Church, Kukatpally, pro-cathedral of the Syro-Malabar Catholic Diocese of Shamshabad

Syro-Malankara Ecclesiastical Provinces

Province of Trivandrum
St. Mary's Cathedral, Pattom, Trivandrum of the Syro-Malankara Major Archeparchy of Trivandrum
St. Mary, Queen of Peace Basilica, former cathedral of the Syro-Malankara Major Archeparchy of Trivandrum
Christuraja Cathedral of the Syro-Malankara Eparchy of Marthandom
St. Mary's Cathedral of the Syro-Malankara Eparchy of Mavelikara
St. Mary's Cathedral of the Syro-Malankara Eparchy of Parassala
St. Peter's Cathedral of the Syro-Malankara Eparchy of Pathanamthitta

Province of Tiruvalla
St. John's Cathedral of the Syro-Malankara Archdiocese of Tiruvalla
St. Joseph's Cathedral of the Syro-Malankara Eparchy of Muvattupuzha
St. Thomas Cathedral in Sulthan Bathery of the Syro-Malankara Diocese of Bathery
St. Mary's Pro-Cathedral, Noojibalthila of the Syro-Malankara Eparchy of Puthur

Directly under the Synod of the Syro-Malankara Church
St. Mary's Cathedral of the Syro-Malankara Catholic Apostolic Exarchate of St. Ephrem of Khadki

Directly under the Holy See
St. Mary's Cathedral of the Syro-Malankara Catholic Eparchy of St. John Chrysostom of Gurgaon

Anglican

Church of South India
Cathedrals of the Church of South India:
 St. George's Cathedral in Chennai
 Holy Trinity Cathedral in Tirunelveli
 St. Mark's Cathedral in Bangalore
 Shanthi Cathedral in Mangalore
 Holy Trinity Cathedral Church in Kottayam
 Christ Cathedral Church in Melukavu
 CSI Cathedral Church in Calicut
 CSI Cathedral Church, LMS compound in Thiruvananthapuram
 Epiphany Cathedral in Dornakal
 Holy Cross Cathedral in Nandyal
 Wesley Cathedral in Karimnagar
 Medak Cathedral in Medak
 St. Andrew's Cathedral in Machilipatnam
 St. John's Cathedral in Nazareth
 CSI Immanuel Cathedral in Kochi, Kerala

Church of North India
Cathedrals of the Church of North India:
 St. George's Cathedral in Sadar Bazaar, Agra
 St. Thomas Cathedral in Car Nicobar
 Christ Church Cathedral in Jabalpur
 St. Paul's Cathedral in Kolkata
 All Saints Cathedral in Allahabad 
 All Saints Cathedral in Nagpur
 St. Saviour Cathedral in Ahmednagar
 St. Paul's Cathedral in Ranchi
 All Saints Cathedral in Shillong
 Christ Church Cathedral in Bhagalpur
 Christ Church Cathedral in Amritsar
 St. Thomas Cathedral in Bombay
 Cathedral Church of the Redemption in New Delhi
 St. Bartholomew Cathedral in Barrackpore
 St. Andrew's Cathedral in Darjeeling
 St. Paul's Cathedral in Poona

Oriental Orthodox

Jacobite Syrian Christian Church 
Cathedrals of the Jacobite Syrian Christian Church:

 St Athanasiaus Cathedral, Puthencruz, Kerala

Angamaly Diocese 
 Mount Sinai Mar Baselios Catholicate Cathedral, Kothamangalam, Cathedral of the Metropolitan of Angamali Diocese (Diocean Headquarters)
 St Mary's Jacobite Syrian Sonooro Cathedral, Angamaly, Kerala, Cathedral of the bishop of Angamaly Region
 Mor Saboor Afroth Jacobite Syrian Cathedral, Akaparambu, Kerala, 
 St Mary's Jacobite Syrian Cathedral, Morakkala, Pallikkara, Kerala, Cathedral of Pallikkara Region
 Bethel Sulokho Jacobite Syrian Cathedral, Perumbavoor, Kerala 
 St Mary's Jacobite Syrian Cathedral, Kuruppampady, Cathedral of the bishop of Perumbavoor Region
 St Thomas Jacobite Syrian Cathedral, Mazhuvannoor, 
 Mathamariyam Jacobite Syrian Cathedral Valiyapally, Kothamangalam, Kerala, Cathedral of the bishop of Kothamangalam Region
 St Mary's Jacobite Syrian Cathedral, Karakkunnam, Kerala, Cathedral of the bishop of Muvattupuzha Region
 St Mary's Jacobite Syrian Nercha Cathedral, Rakkad, Kerala 
 St George Jacobite Syrian Cathedral, Adimali, Cathedral of the bishop of Highrange Region

Kandanad Diocese 
 St George Cathedral, Kadakkanad (Diocesan Headquarters), Cathedral of the metropolitan of Kandanad.
 St Mary's Jacobite Syrian Cathedral, Kandanad, Kerala, Mother Parish of the diocese Kandanad Region)
 St Mary's Rajadhiraja Jacobite Syrian Cathedral, Piravom, Kerala one of the oldest Christian church in the world
 St.Peter's & St.Paul's Jacobite Syrian Cathedral, Neeramukal

Kochi Diocese 
 Kyomtha Cathedral, Thiruvamkulam (Diocean Headquarters), Cathedral of the metropolitan of Kochi
 Marthomman Jacobite Syrian Cathedral, Mulanthuruthy, Kerala 
 St George Jacobite Syrian Cathedral, Karingachira, Kerala.

Kottayam, Idukki Dioceses 
 St Joseph Jacobite Syrian Cathedral, Kottayam. Cathedral of the metropolitan of Kottayam
 Marthamariyam Cathedral, Manarcad, Kerala of Manarcad Region
 St George Cathedral, Kattapana

Simhasa Churches 
 St Mary's Sonoro Cathedral, Elamkulam, Kerala of Ernakulam Region
 St:Peter's Jacobite Syrian Simhasana Cathedral, Thiruvananthapuram of Thiruvananthapuram Region
 Mor Ignatius Cathedral, Manjinikkara of Manjinikkara Region
 St Ignatius Cathedral, Puthenangady of Kottayam Region

Knanaya Diocese 
 Knanaya St Johns Cathedral, Chingavanam, Kerala. Cathedral of the Archbishop of the knanaya archdiocese

North Kerala (Malabar, Kozhikode and Thrissur) 
 St Peter's & St Paul's Jacobite Syrian Cathedral, Meenangadi, Cathedral of the metropolitan of Malabar.
 St George Jacobite Syrian Patriarchal Cathedral Pulpally
 St Mary's Jacobite Syrian Cathedral Calicut.Cathedral of the bishop of Calicut.

South Kerala (Niranam, Thumbamon and Kollam) 
 St. Mary's Cathedral, Kundara (traditional parish)
 St George Jacobite Syrian Cathedral, Kavumbhagam, Kerala (Niranam Diocese Diocean Headquarters Cathedral of the metropolitan of niranam.
 St Mary's Jacobite Syrian Cathedral, Pathanamthitta (Thumbamon Diocean Headquarters) Cathedral of the metropolitan of Thumbamon
 St Thomas Jacobite Syrian Cathedral, Manthalir.
 St Mary's Jacobite Syrian Orthodox Cathedral, Vallikodu Kottayam, Pathanamthitta (Thumpamon Diocese)

Outside Kerala (Bangalore, Delhi, Mylapore, Mangalore, Mumbai) 
 St Mary's Jacobite Syrian Cathedral, Bangalore
 St Peter's Jacobite Syrian Cathedral, New Delhi
 St Gregorios Jacobite Cathedral, Mettuguda, Hyderabad
 St Antony's Jacobite Syrian Cathedral, Jeppu, Mangalore, Karnataka

Evangalical Association 
St George Jacobite Cathedral, Pulpally

Malankara Orthodox Syrian Church
Cathedrals of the Malankara Orthodox Syrian Church:

In Kerala 
 Kadeesa Orthodox Cathedral, Kayamkulam, Kerala of Mavelikkara diocese
 Mar Elia Cathedral, Kottayam, Kerala of Kottayam Central Diocese
 St. George Orthodox Cathedral, Kunnakurady, Kerala of Angamaly Diocese
 St. George Orthodox Cathedral, Kozhikode, Kerala of Malabar Diocese
 St. George Orthodox Cathedral, Thiruvananthapuram, Kerala of Trivandrum diocese
 St. Ignatius Orthodox Cathedral, Chengannur, Kerala of Chengannur diocese
 St. Ignatius Orthodox Cathedral, Thrissur, Kerala of Thrissur diocese
 St. Ignatious Orthodox Cathedral, Kaipatoor, Kerala of Thumpamon diocese
 St. John's Orthodox Cathedral, Pampady, Kerala of Kottayan diocese
 St. Mary's Orthodox Cathedral, Mulakulam, Kerala of Kandanad West diocese
 St. Mary's Orthodox Cathedral, Kandanad, Kerala of Kandanad West diocese
 St. Mary's Orthodox Cathedral, Puthencavu, of Chengannur diocese, Kerala
 St. Mary's Orthodox Cathedral, Puthiyakavu, Kerala of Mavelikkara diocese
 St. Mary's Orthodox Cathedral, Niranam, Kerala of Niranam diocese
 St. Mary's Orthodox Cathedral, Sulthanbathery, Kerala of Sultan Bathery diocese
 St. Mary's Orthodox Cathedral, Thumpamon, Kerala of Thumpamon diocese
 St. Mary's Orthodox Cathedral, Ernakulam, Kerala of Kochi diocese
 St. Mary's Orthodox Cathedral, Pazhanji, Kerala of Kunnamkulam diocese
 St. Mary's Orthodox Cathedral, Arthat, Kerala of Kunnamkulam Diocese
 St. Stephens Orthodox Cathedral,[(Makkamkunnu, Pathanamthitta)], Kerala, Thumpamon Diocese
 St. Stephen's Orthodox Cathedral, Kudassanad, Kerala of Chengannur diocese
 St. Thomas Orthodox Cathedral, Kadampanad, Kerala of Adoor-Kadampanad diocese
 St. Thomas Orthodox Cathedral, Kannamkode, Adoor, Kerala of Adoor-Kadampanad diocese
 St. Thomas Orthodox Cathedral, Kungiripetty, Kerala of Idukki diocese
 St. Thomas Orthodox Cathedral, Kollam, Kerala of Kollam Diocese
 St. Thomas Orthodox Cathedral, Karthikappally, Kerala of Mavelikkara diocese
 St. Thomas Orthodox Cathedral, Muvattupuzha, Kerala of Kandanad East diocese
 St Thomas Orthodox Cathedral, Thottomon, Ranny, Kerala of Nilackal diocese

Outside Kerala 
 St. Antony's Orthodox Syrian Cathedral Brahmavar, Karnataka
 St. Gregorios Orthodox Cathedral, Bangalore, Karnataka
 Mar Gregorios Cathedral, Bhilai, Chhattisgarh
 St. Thomas Orthodox Cathedral, Broadway, Chennai, Tamil Nadu
 St. George Orthodox Cathedral, Nagpur, Maharashtra
 St. Thomas Orthodox Cathedral, Bhopal, Madhya Pradesh
 St. Thomas Orthodox Cathedral, Kolkata, West Bengal
 St. Mary's Orthodox Cathedral, Ahmedabad, Gujarat
 St. Mary's Orthodox Cathedral, Dadar, Maharashtra
 St. Mary's Orthodox Cathedral, Brahmavar, Karnataka
 St. Mary's Orthodox Cathedral, Hauz Khas, Delhi
 St. Mary's Orthodox Cathedral, Port Blair, Andaman
 St. Mary's Orthodox Cathedral, Coimbatore, Tamil Nadu
 St. Gregorios Orthodox Cathedral, Hyderabad, Andhra Pradesh

See also
List of cathedrals
Christianity in India
List of Catholic dioceses in India
List of Catholic bishops of India
List of basilicas in India
Territories of Catholic dioceses in India

References

External links

List of Cathedrals in India by Giga-Catholic Information
Churches of India, YouTube channel with montages of photos of cathedrals and churches in India

 *
India
Cathedrals